Friedrich "Fritz" Waller (March 18, 1920 – February 15, 2004) was a Swiss bobsledder who competed in the late 1940s. He won the gold medal in the two-man event at the 1948 Winter Olympics in St. Moritz.

Waller also won three medals at the FIBT World Championships with one gold (Two-man: 1949), one silver (Two-man: 1947) and one bronze (Four-man: 1949).

References
 Bobsleigh two-man Olympic medalists 1932-56 and since 1964
 Bobsleigh two-man world championship medalists since 1931
 Bobsleigh four-man world championship medalists since 1930

External links
 
 

1920 births
2004 deaths
Bobsledders at the 1948 Winter Olympics
Swiss male bobsledders
Olympic medalists in bobsleigh
Medalists at the 1948 Winter Olympics
Olympic gold medalists for Switzerland
20th-century Swiss people